The Vanderbilt Family Cemetery and Mausoleum is a private burial site within the Moravian Cemetery in the New Dorp neighborhood of Staten Island, New York City. It was designed by Richard Morris Hunt and Frederick Law Olmsted in the late 19th century, when the Vanderbilt family was the wealthiest in America.

Location
The Vanderbilt Family Cemetery and Mausoleum is on the eastern slope of Todt Hill, inside the Moravian Cemetery located at 2205 Richmond Road. The cemetery opened in 1740 and is the largest and oldest active cemetery on Staten Island.

History  
In 1865, Cornelius Vanderbilt gave the Moravian Church . Three years later, he donated an additional , which is the majority of the Moravian Cemetery and the site of the private Vanderbilt plot. Later, his son William Henry Vanderbilt gave a further  and constructed the residence for the cemetery superintendent. William commissioned the family mausoleum, and was the richest person in America when he died in December 1885.

Mausoleum  
The Vanderbilt mausoleum, designed by Richard Morris Hunt and constructed in 1885–1886, is part of the family's private section within the cemetery. Hunt's design was inspired by the 12th-century Romanesque Saint-Gilles-du-Gard Abbey near Arles, France. The landscaped grounds around the mausoleum were designed by Frederick Law Olmsted. The Vanderbilt section is not open to the public. Interment within the mausoleum was reserved to those with the Vanderbilt name, including sons, their wives, and unmarried daughters. It houses the remains of all four of William and Maria's sons and three of their wives. 

The mausoleum was made a New York City designated landmark in 2016. The New York City Landmarks Preservation Commission's chair said at the time: "The Vanderbilt Mausoleum is an extraordinary monument to America's Gilded Age." In June 2021, the mausoleum was nominated for inclusion on the New York State and National Register of Historic Places. It was added to the NRHP on July 30, 2021.

Vanderbilt Cemetery Association 
The nonprofit Vanderbilt Cemetery Association was created in 2010 by members of the Vanderbilt family to help preserve and protect the property. Alfred Gwynne Vanderbilt III is chairman.

Notable burials 
Notable burials in the Vanderbilt family's private section within the cemetery include:

 Cornelius Vanderbilt (1794–1877), railroad and shipping tycoon.
 William Henry Vanderbilt (1821–1885), son of Cornelius.
 Cornelius van Derbilt (1764–1832), father of Cornelius.
 Phebe van Derbilt (née Hand) (1767–1854), mother of Cornelius.
 Sophia Johnson Vanderbilt (1795–1868), first wife of Cornelius.
 Frank Armstrong Crawford Vanderbilt (1839–1885), second wife of Cornelius.
 George Washington Vanderbilt (1832–1836).
 George Washington Vanderbilt (1839–1863).
 George Washington Vanderbilt II (1862–1914), son of William.
 Maria Louisa Kissam Vanderbilt (1821–1896), wife of William.
 Frances Lavinia Vanderbilt (1829–1868).
 Gloria Vanderbilt (1924–2019), daughter of Reginald, wife of Wyatt Emory Cooper.
 Wyatt Emory Cooper (1927–1978), American author, screenwriter, actor, and fourth husband of Gloria Vanderbilt.
 Carter Vanderbilt Cooper (1965–1988), son of Gloria Vanderbilt and Wyatt Cooper, older brother of Anderson Cooper.
 Alfred Gwynne Vanderbilt Jr. (1912–1999), society scion and racetrack/racehorse owner.
 Cornelius Vanderbilt II (1843–1899), son of William.
 Reginald Claypoole Vanderbilt (1880–1925), millionaire, equestrian, gambler, son of Cornelius II.

See also
 List of United States cemeteries
 List of New York City Designated Landmarks in Staten Island
 National Register of Historic Places listings in Staten Island

References

Cemeteries in Staten Island
Vanderbilt family
Rural cemeteries
New Dorp, Staten Island
New York City Designated Landmarks in Staten Island
Cemeteries on the National Register of Historic Places in New York City